Frédéric Godart is a French sociologist and researcher who is an Associate Professor of Organizational Behavior at INSEAD in Fontainebleau (France). His work is on the dynamics of creative industries, and fashion and luxury. Godart's 2012 book is called Unveiling Fashion: Business, Culture, and Identity in the Most Glamorous Industry.

Early life and education 
In autumn 1997, Godart was admitted to the Ecole normale supérieure de Cachan (1997-2002), from which he earned degrees in Economics and Social Sciences. He graduated from the Sciences Po Paris with an MSc in Management in 2001. Godart was also interested in Social and Political Sciences and attended University of Cambridge (Trinity College) in the United Kingdom, where he obtained MPhil in 2002. In 2009 Godart received his PhD in Sociology from Columbia University New York.

Career 
Godart worked for three years with McKinsey & Company in Belgium. From 2011 to 2019 Godart served as Assistant Professor of Organisational Behaviour at INSEAD, teaching Power & Politics (P&P) and Organisational Behaviour II: Leading Organisations (OB2) in the INSEAD MBA program. Prior to joining INSEAD as a full-time tenure-track Assistant Professor in 2011, he spent two years at INSEAD as a post-doctoral researcher and a teaching fellow. 

Godart received the French national accreditation for supervising PhD-level research ("Habilitation à Diriger des Recherches" or HDR) in 2011, from the Paris-Dauphine University.

In 2012, Godart published Unveiling Fashion: Business, Culture, and Identity in the Most Glamorous Industry. In the book, he presents fashion as a social and cultural fact and offers a comprehensive account of the global fashion industry, taking the reader through its economic, social, and political arena.

Godart was a visiting scholar from May 2014 - October 2014 at the University of Southern California's Department of Management and Organization.
In September 2018, Godart moved to HEC Paris as an Associate Professor of Management and Human Resources, where he taught Leading Organizations in the Master in Management (MiM), and Leadership and Strategic Talent Management in the HEC Paris International EMBA. He was the Academic Director of the HEC Luxury Certificate sponsored by Kering. In 2019, he returned to INSEAD as Associate Professor of Organisational Behaviour with tenure.

Godart's main area of research centers on the impact of formal and informal social networks on creativity, as well as the role played by stylistic choices and brand dynamics in the formation of firms and customers’ identities. He has published his research in journals Organization Science, Organization Studies, the Annual Review of Sociology, the Harvard Business Review and Social Forces, and in several edited books. He wrote a book on the structure and culture of the fashion industry, Sociologie de la mode (A Sociology of Fashion), which has been translated into Portuguese and Spanish. He also wrote a book on the intellectual history of fashion, Penser la Mode (Thinking about Fashion). In his research activity, he also addresses the influence of fashion capitals in the fashion industry and leads the non-profit research IFDAQ Global Fashion & Luxury Cities IPX index.

Godart has been featured in El Pais, The Financial Times, Forbes

 and in Le Monde, and is a frequent speaker at conferences and events.

In November 2018, Godart joined the Intel-backed and Austrian fashion intelligence firm IFDAQ, for which he serves as the Co-CEO and Head of Industry.

Awards and honors 
 2012 "Best Paper Award" by Academy of Management
 2017 "Best New Directions Paper Award" by Academy of Management

Selected books 
 Penser La Mode (Ifm, 2011) 
 Unveiling Fashion: Business, Culture, And Identity In The Most Glamorous Industry (INSEAD Business Press, Palgrave Macmillan, 2012) 
 Sustainable Luxury: Managing Social and Environmental Performance in Iconic Brands (Article; Greenleaf Co, 2015) 
 Aesthetics and Style in Strategy (Emerald Publishing Limited, 2020, co-edited)

Selected articles 
 The Sociology of Creativity: Elements, Structures, and Audiences (Jul 2020) 
 Explaining the Popularity of Cultural Elements: Networks, Culture, and the Structural Embeddedness of High Fashion Trends (Jan 2019)
 How and When do Conglomerates Influence the Creativity of their Subsidiaries? (Sep 2018) 
 Culture, structure, and the market interface: Exploring the networks of stylistic elements and houses in fashion (May 2018)

References

External links 
 Frédéric Godart at Researchgate
 Frédéric Godart's Citations at Google Scholar
 INSEAD Faculty Profile

Living people
French sociologists
French academics
21st-century French writers
Academic staff of INSEAD
Alumni of the University of Cambridge
Columbia Graduate School of Arts and Sciences alumni
Year of birth missing (living people)
21st-century non-fiction writers
French non-fiction writers